Noor-E-Alam Chowdhury (born 1 June 1964), also known by his daak naam Liton, is a Bangladesh Awami League politician and Member of Parliament from Madaripur-1 and the Chief whip of Jatiya Sangsad.

Early life 
Chowdhury was born on 1 June 1964 to a Bengali Muslim family of Chowdhuries in the village of Duttapara in Shibchar, Madaripur, then part of East Pakistan's Faridpur district. His parents, Ilias Ahmed Chowdhury and Sheikh Feroza Begum, are cousins of Prime Minister Sheikh Hasina. His father was a politician and came from a zamindar family whilst his mother, Sheikh Feroza Begum, was a housewife. Chowdhury had Iraqi Arab ancestry through both of his grandmothers, who were direct descendants of the 15th-century Muslim preacher Sheikh Awwal of Baghdad. Both of his grandmothers were also sisters of Sheikh Mujibur Rahman.

Chowdhury completed Higher Secondary School Certificate examination. He is the grand-nephew of Sheikh Mujibur Rahman.

Career 
Chowdhury's father, Ilias Ahmed Chowdhury, died in May 1991 while serving as member of parliament from Madaripur-1. Chowdhury contested in the subsequent by-election after the death of his father and was elected parliament as an Awami League candidate in September 1991.

Chowdhury was re-elected to parliament in June 1996 as a candidate of the Awami League. He received 61,012 votes while his nearest rival, Abul Khaer Chowdhury of Bangladesh Nationalist Party, received 29,312 votes.

Chowdhury was re-elected to parliament in 2001 as a candidate of the Awami League. He received 98,898 votes while his nearest rival, Khalilur Rahman Chowdhury of Bangladesh Nationalist Party, received 47,831 votes.

In 2008, Chowdhury was re-elected to parliament as a candidate of the Awami League. He received 119,767 votes while his nearest rival, independent candidate Kamal Zaman Mollah, received 20,443 votes. He is a trustee of the Bangabandhu Memorial Trust. He was a whip of the 9th parliament.

Chowdhury was elected to Parliament in 2014 from Madaripur-1 as a Awami League Candidate unopposed as the election was boycotted by opposition parties. He was appointed the whip of the Parliament. He is also a member of the parliamentary standing committee on Ministry of Housing and Public Works. He was the Chairman of the Parliamentary Standing Committee on Ministry of Shipping. In February 2017, he was made secretary of the Awami League Parliamentary Party. He is the chief advisor of the Shibchar Upazila Shomity.

In 2018, Chowdhury was re-elected to parliament as a candidate of the Awami League from Madaripur-1. He received 227,393 votes while his nearest rival, Sazzad Hossain Sidiquee of Bangladesh Nationalist Party, received 313 votes. He was appointed chief whip of the 11th parliament.

References 

1964 births
Living people
People from Madaripur District
Awami League politicians
5th Jatiya Sangsad members
7th Jatiya Sangsad members
8th Jatiya Sangsad members
9th Jatiya Sangsad members
10th Jatiya Sangsad members
11th Jatiya Sangsad members
Sheikh Mujibur Rahman family